William Henry Fisk (1827–1884), was an English painter of landscapes and historical subjects, and a drawing-master.

Life
Fisk, born in Homerton, Middlesex, was the son of William Fisk. He was a pupil of his father, and also studied at the Royal Academy. He was a skilled draughtsman, and as such was appointed anatomical draughtsman to the Royal College of Surgeons. He exhibited as a painter for the first time in 1846. Three years later he was the first of a series of artists to be invited to Balmoral to paint watercolour views for Queen Victoria. She selected four of his images of the area for inclusion in one of her 'souvenir albums'.

He exhibited paintings of historical, religious and genre subjects at the Royal Academy from 1850 until 1873, and was an occasional exhibitor at the other London exhibitions and also in Paris. He was teacher of drawing and painting to University College School, London, and in that capacity was very successful and of high repute. He was a clear and logical lecturer on the practical aspect of art, and succeeded in attracting large audiences in London and the provinces. He also occasionally contributed articles on painting to the press. He was appointed anatomical draughtsman to the Royal College of Surgeons.

In the 1860s Fisk was commissioned to design mosaics depicting Lorenzo Ghiberti and Albrecht Dürer as part of a series of portraits of great artists for the 'Kensington Valhalla' in the South Court of the South Kensington Museum (now the Victoria and Albert Museum). Only the painting of Ghiberti was reproduced in mosaic, but Fisk's full sized oil versions for both remain in the museum.

In 1863, Fisk is interested in the French Revolution with the painting Robespierre Receiving Letters from Friends of his Victims with Assassination Threats, exhibited nowadays in the Musée de la Révolution française.

He died on 13 November 1884, at No. 27 Church Row, in Hampstead, in his 58th year and was buried on the western side of Highgate Cemetery.

References

Sources

1827 births
1884 deaths
Burials at Highgate Cemetery
19th-century English painters
English male painters
19th-century British educators
British draughtsmen
Schoolteachers from London
19th-century English male artists